The Los Angeles 2016 Olympic bid is a reference to the unsuccessful attempt by the city of Los Angeles, with help from the Greater Los Angeles area, to be chosen by the United States Olympic Committee as the official United States bid for the International Olympic Committee 2016 Summer Olympics host city competition. On July 26, 2006, the USOC had narrowed its list of candidates to Chicago, Los Angeles and San Francisco. San Francisco later withdrew its bid on November 13, 2006. On April 14, 2007, Chicago was selected as the United States bid. Two years later, Chicago lost their bid to Rio de Janeiro when the IOC voted to select the host city.

United States Olympic Committee 

The USOC's chairman, Peter Ueberroth, visited potential host cities in May 2006. Ueberroth and his party visited Los Angeles on May 18.
Los Angeles has many existing sports venues, including many that were built in the years since the 1984 Summer Olympics, when Los Angeles last hosted. Existing venues currently include the following:

Los Angeles Memorial Coliseum- Ceremonies and track competitions, 80 000
Staples Center- Indoor venue and basketball competitions, 18 000
Honda Center- Indoor venue and basketball venue 2, 16 000
Los Angeles Memorial Sports Arena- Indoor venue and gymnastics/handball final, 16 000
Long Beach Sports Arena- Indoor venue and handball preliminaries/quarterfinals, 10 000
Walter Pyramid- Indoor venue and handball preliminaries 2, 5 000
The Forum- Indoor venue and volleyball venue, 18 000
The Home Depot Center- Soccer/Football events, 28 000
Galen Center- Indoor venue on the USC campus and boxing, 10 000
Pauley Pavilion- Indoor venue on the UCLA campus and volleyball preliminaries 2, 12 000
Rose Bowl- Outdoor stadium, 90 000
Angel Stadium- Outdoor venue and baseball preliminaries, 45 000
Dodger Stadium- Outdoor venue and baseball final, 55 000
San Pedro/Long Beach Harbor Area- Rowing, Canoe-sprint, 20 000
Santa Anita Park- Equestrian events, 60 000
Sam Boyd Stadium- Football Preliminaries in Las Vegas, 35 000
University of Phoenix Stadium- Football Preliminaries in Glendale, Arizona, 60 000

Infrastructure 
Several hundred miles of commuter rail and rapid transit are present in Southern California, none of which existed in 1984. Many lines are still under construction, will reach several of the major sporting venues, and are planned to be completed in 2009, the same year the winning city was to be announced.
Metrolink
Los Angeles County Metropolitan Transportation Authority
Los Angeles County Metro Rail
Metro Purple Line - may connect to a planned athletes village and the Pauley Pavilion at UCLA.
Metro Red Line - Downtown to Hollywood and the Valley tourist spots.
Metro Blue Line - connects to Staples Center and Home Depot Center.
Metro Green Line - connects near Los Angeles International Airport.
Metro Gold Line - connects to Rose Bowl, might connect to Santa Anita Park by 2013.
Metro Expo Line - connects to Galen Center, a Media Center/Family village at USC and the Los Angeles Memorial Coliseum.

Sport culture 
Los Angeles is the home of the following professional sports teams:
 Los Angeles Dodgers and * Los Angeles Angels of Anaheim Major League Baseball 
 Los Angeles Kings of the NHL 
 Los Angeles Lakers and Los Angeles Clippers of the NBA 
 Los Angeles Sparks of the WNBA 
 Los Angeles Galaxy and LAFC of Major League Soccer 
 Los Angeles Rams of the National Football League
 Los Angeles Chargers of the National Football League

Prior to 1995, the Rams (1946–1994) and the Raiders (1982–1994) of the NFL were in the Los Angeles market. The Los Angeles Angels of Anaheim and Anaheim Ducks are both based in nearby Anaheim.

No reference to the sport culture of Los Angeles would be complete without mentioning the immensely successful intercollegiate athletics programs at UCLA and the University of Southern California, both of which have been the breeding grounds for countless Olympic gold-medalists in nearly every Olympic sport.

Beach volleyball and windsurfing were both invented in the area (though predecessors of both were invented in some form by Duke Kahanamoku in Hawaii). Venice, also known as Dogtown, is credited with being the birthplace of skateboarding and the place where rollerblading first became popular. Area beaches are popular with surfers, who have created their own subculture.

Los Angeles has twice played host to the summer Olympic Games: in 1932 and in 1984, both of which were profitable, the latter being the most profitable Olympics in history, with profits of over $200 million. When the tenth Olympic Games were hosted in 1932, the former 10th Street was renamed Olympic Blvd. The 1984 Summer Olympics inspired the creation of the Los Angeles Marathon, which has been celebrated every year in March since 1986. 
Super Bowls I and VII were also contested in the city as was the World Cup Final in 1994.

City recognition 
The Los Angeles area contains all kinds of topography, notably the hills and mountains rising around the metropolis (it's the only major city in the United States bisected by a mountain range); four mountain ranges extend into city boundaries. Thousands of miles of trails crisscross the city and neighboring areas, providing exercise and wilderness access on foot, bike, or horse. Across the county a great variety of outdoor activities are available, such as skiing, rock climbing, gold panning, hang gliding, and windsurfing. Numerous outdoor clubs serve these sports, including the Angeles Chapter of the Sierra Club, which leads over 4,000 outings annually in the area.

Los Angeles is also known as The Entertainment Capital of the World with Hollywood and its beautiful beaches makes it a wonderful summer city for the games which is seen as a plus for the city. The Los Angeles area, recognized by its sprawling urban terrain, is one of the world's most important centers of culture, science, technology, international trade, and higher education, and is home to numerous world-renowned institutions in a broad range of professional and cultural fields. The city and its immediate surrounding vicinity leads the world in producing popular entertainment—such as motion pictures, television, and recorded music—which forms the base of its international fame and global status.

Developments
On June 23, 2006, five United States candidates met in California to offer official presentations to the USOC Board of Directors. Chicago Tribune  reported of the event on June 24, "USOC officials indicated they could whittle down the field of five contenders in as soon as three weeks." The article also stated, "Observers say it's likely to be a three-way horse race between.... San Francisco, Chicago and Olympic veteran Los Angeles." As predicted, the USOC on July 26, 2006, officially named San Francisco, Los Angeles and Chicago as the three US finalists for the 2016 Olympics, dropping Philadelphia and Houston. However, on November 13, 2006, San Francisco withdrew its bid from the national selection process, leaving Chicago and Los Angeles as the only contenders in the U.S. bid.

On January 9, the USOC announced that they will go forward in presenting an American bid to the international competition for the 2016 games. The next step was for the city of Los Angeles and Chicago to have a bid book ready for the committee by January 22 for review and a video stating why the USOC should pick their city to represent America for International competition, to have ready for their cities evaluation See Below. On April 14, the evaluation team presented its findings to the USOC board of directors, and Chicago was chosen as the submission to the International Olympic Committee.

USOC visit
The USOC toured Los Angeles for a two-day visit on March 1 and 2nd of 2007.  They were greeted at the planned athletes village, UCLA, by the Southern California Committee for the Olympic Games, Antonio Villaraigosa, and six Olympic athletes supporting L.A.'s Bid. 
The USOC required the two bidding cities to produce a short video answering the question, "Why their city?" USOC officials were shown a video made by The Walt Disney Studios, that showcased various athletes, movie stars and famous Los Angeles landmarks.
They later attended a dinner party hosted by the Mayor at the Getty Center overlooking the city. Various celebrities, business leaders, politicians and Olympic Athletes were in attendance.
The following day, the committee took the USOC on the Metro Blue Line to Long Beach, showcasing the new 95 miles of existing, under-construction and planned light rail and subway lines of the Los Angeles Transit system.
After the tour of Long Beach, they followed the Blue Line to the Staples Center for a tour of the arena and the Downtown area, where Olympic activities and festivities would take place.

Supporters
 85-90% of residents support the city's bid to host the Games.
 Mayor Antonio Villaraigosa
 Anschutz Entertainment Group
 Alexi Lalas
 Pasadena Mayor Bill Bogaard
 Long Beach Mayor Bob Foster
 The City of Las Vegas - Soccer Preliminaries
 Mia Hamm
 California Legislature
 Phil Jackson
 Los Angeles Sports Organization (Lakers, Clippers, Galaxy, Kings, Dodgers, Angels, etc.)
 California Governor Arnold Schwarzenegger
 Oscar Winner Forest Whitaker
 Peter Vidmar
 Janet Evans
 Willie Banks
 Jonathan Beutler
 Rafer Johnson
 Barry Sanders, SCCOG Chairman
 The Walt Disney Company
 Jerry Bruckheimer
 Mark Spitz
 Serena Williams
 Venus Williams
 John Naber
 Arizona Cardinals - whose stadium (University of Phoenix Stadium) will be in use for soccer events
 Carl Lewis
 Wolfgang Puck
 Bruce Hendricks

Benefits
If the 2016 Summer Olympics were to have been held in Los Angeles, the Games would have generated more than $7 billion in potential revenue and create nearly 70,000 jobs. It would have created 67,825 full-time jobs, many of them in the hospitality and transportation industry. Many of these jobs might well have remained after the games, officials said, although they didn't give a figure. Los Angeles is one of the four cities from the United States bidding for the 2024 Summer Olympics. 1 September 2015 Los Angeles has been chosen as the U.S. candidate to bid for the 2024 Summer Olympics.

Los Angeles was later selected to host the 2028 Summer Olympics and Paralympics.

See also
1932 Summer Olympics
1984 Summer Olympics
Los Angeles bid for the 2024 Summer Olympics

References

United States Olympic Committee Moves Forward With Three 2016 Applicant Cities
Los Angeles seeking to return to Olympic arena

External links
Southern California Committee for the Olympic Games - Home
LA 2016 Bid Book

2016 Summer Olympics bids
Sports competitions in Los Angeles